The 2014 ICC World Twenty20 Final was played between India and Sri Lanka at the Sher-e-Bangla National Stadium in Dhaka on 6 April 2014. This was the 5th ICC World Twenty20. Sri Lanka won the match by six wickets, its first World Twenty20 victory, after being runners-up twice at 2009 and 2012. Sri Lanka became the 5th team to win this title after India, Pakistan, England , West Indies This was the third time where both the finalists were Asian teams. In the stadium, the match was watched by 25,000 spectators.

Background 
Prior to this match India and Sri Lanka played 5 times against each other in Twenty20s, where Sri Lanka won 3 times and India won 2 times. In 2010 ICC World Twenty20 these teams met each other where Sri Lanka beat India by 5 wickets in a last ball thriller. This was their only meeting in an ICC World Twenty20 until this match.

Road to the final

India 
India directly qualified for the super 10s. They started their tournament strongly. They won their first match against Pakistan very easily. They beat West Indies, Bangladesh and Australia easily to be the topper of Group 1 with a 100% win rate. In the semi final they faced South Africa. A 72 not out innings from Virat Kohli helped India to qualify for the final.

Sri Lanka 
Sri Lanka was one of the favorite of this tournament. They were the champions of Group 2 with wins against Netherlands, South Africa and New Zealand. But they lost to England. Their win against Netherlands was the biggest victory in terms of balls remaining in all T20I. Also they bowled out Netherlands for only 39 runs which is the lowest score in all T20I. In the semifinal Sri Lanka met defending champion West Indies. Sri Lanka won by 27 runs (D/L method) in that rain interrupted game.

Team Composition 
India team was unchanged from their semi final line up. The team didn't want to change their winning combination so they didn't change their line up for the final.

But there was a change in the Sri Lankan line up. Thisara Perera replaced Seekkuge Prasanna in the Sri Lankan line up for the final.

Match details

Match officials
The on-field umpires were Ian Gould and Richard Kettleborough of England, with Rod Tucker being the third (TV) umpire. Bruce Oxenford was the fourth umpire. David Boon was the match referee.

Toss
Sri Lankan captain Lasith Malinga won the toss and decided to field first in that rain delayed final.

Match Summary

References

External links 
ICC World Twenty20 2014

ICC Men's T20 World Cup Finals
International cricket competitions in 2014